Blob may refer to:

Science

Computing 
 Binary blob, in open source software, a non-free object file loaded into the kernel
 Binary large object (BLOB), in computer database systems
 A storage mechanism in the cloud computing platform Microsoft Azure
 Blob URI scheme, a URI scheme for binary data
 A region in an image detected by a blob detector.

Other science
 Blob (visual system), sections of the visual cortex where groups of color-sensitive neurons assemble
 The blob (Chukchi Sea algae), a large blob of algae first spotted in the Chukchi Sea
 The Blob (Pacific Ocean), a mass of warm water spreading off the Pacific coast of North America
 Blob, a common name for Physarum polycephalum, a slime mold species

Entertainment 
 The Blob, 1958 American science-fiction film depicting a giant, amoeba-like alien
 The Blob (1988 film), a remake of the 1958 film
 The Blobs, an animated television series
 Blob (video game), a 1993 Amiga video game
 The Problem Blob, a villain in the BBC television series the Numberjacks
 de Blob, a 2008 Wii video game
 The Blob (Clayfighter), a playable character in the ClayFighter video games
 Blob (comics), a Marvel Comics supervillain, adversary of the X-Men
 Blobs, a former animated mascot of the British television channel BBC3

Games 
 Blob (card game), a British scoring variant of the card game, Oh Hell

Weights and measures 
 Blob, a British unit of mass, equal to twelve slugs

Other
 A nickname for the  foreign policy establishment in the United States
 Blob, mascot of the Philadelphia Stars

See also
 A Boy and His Blob, a 2009 video game
 Blobbing, an outdoor activity where a participant sits on an inflated air bag, or blob, and is launched into the air and falls into a body of water
 Blobfish (disambiguation), deep sea fish
 Cold blob (North Atlantic), a mass of cold water in the North Atlantic